Bonagota chiapasana is a species of moth of the family Tortricidae. It is found in Chiapas, Mexico.

References

Moths described in 2000
Euliini
Moths of Central America
Taxa named by Józef Razowski